Jay Hammer (born November 16, 1944) is an American actor best known for his run as freelancer journalist Fletcher Reade who falls in love with Dr. Claire Ramsey on CBS Daytime's Guiding Light from March 1984 until March 1998. He returned briefly in the spring of 1999, and again made an appearance as the show ended in 2009. He had a notable role as Allan Willis during the 1978–1979 season of The Jeffersons. His character on The Jeffersons was the son of mixed-race couple Tom and Helen Willis (Franklin Cover and Roxie Roker).

Other appearances include roles in The Blue Knight, Kojak, Mannix, Sons and Daughters, Emergency!, and Adam-12. His theater credits include off-Broadway productions of Passing Through from Exotic Places and Serenading Louie. He played the role of ranch forehand Max Dekker on Texas in 1981.

Personal life
He lived for five years with Texas and Guiding Light writer Pamela K. Long; they have one child. He has been married to Dene Nardi since 1990; they have two children. Hammer wrote for Guiding Light under the name Charles Jay Hammer.

References

External links

Clips from Texas episodes

1944 births
Living people
American male soap opera actors
American soap opera writers
American male screenwriters
Male actors from San Francisco
University of the Pacific (United States) alumni
American male television writers
Screenwriters from California